Ámundadóttir is a surname. Notable people with the name include:

 Guðrún Ósk Ámundadóttir (born 1987), Icelandic basketball coach and player
 Laufey Ámundadóttir, Icelandic cell biologist and geneticist 
 Sigrún Sjöfn Ámundadóttir (born 1988), Icelandic basketball player